Sweetwater Creek is a stream in the U.S. state of Georgia. It is a tributary to Echeconnee Creek.

Sweetwater Creek received its name in the 1770s, most likely for the fresh water which flows there.

References

Rivers of Georgia (U.S. state)
Rivers of Crawford County, Georgia